Karen Cushman (born October 4, 1941) is an American writer of historical fiction.

Career
Cushman's 1995 novel The Midwife's Apprentice won the Newbery Medal for children's literature, and her 1994 novel Catherine, Called Birdy won a Newbery Honor. She has a bachelor of arts degree in Greek and English from Stanford University and master's degrees in human behavior and museum studies.sup  For 11 years she was adjunct professor in the Museum Studies Department at John F. Kennedy University before resigning in 1996 to write full-time. She lives and writes on Vashon Island, Washington.

Books
 Catherine, Called Birdy (1994)
 The Midwife's Apprentice (1995)
 The Ballad of Lucy Whipple (1998)
 Matilda Bone (2000)
 Rodzina (2004)
 The Loud Silence of Francine Green  (2006)
 Alchemy and Meggy Swann  (2010)
 Will Sparrow's Road (2012)
 Grayling's Song (2016)
War and Millie McGonigle (2021)

Other media
The Ballad of Lucy Whipple was made into a TV film, broadcast in 2001.
Catherine Called Birdy was made into a film in 2022, see Catherine Called Birdy (film).

Awards
 1995 Newbery Honor for Catherine, Called Birdy
 1995 Golden Kite Award for Catherine, Called Birdy
 1996 Newbery Medal for The Midwife's Apprentice
 1997 John and Patricia Beatty Award for The Ballad of Lucy Whipple, given by the California Library Association.
  2004 Washington State Book Award for Rodzina
 2007 Kerlan Award at the University of Minnesota's Children's Literature Research Collection for her contributions to the Kerlan Collection.

References

External links

 

1941 births
American children's writers
American historical novelists
Newbery Honor winners
Newbery Medal winners
Writers from Chicago
Living people
American women children's writers
American women novelists
Women historical novelists
20th-century American novelists
20th-century American women writers
Novelists from Illinois
People from Vashon, Washington
21st-century American women